

This is a list of the National Register of Historic Places listings in Davidson County, Tennessee.

This is intended to be a complete list of the properties and districts on the National Register of Historic Places in Davidson County, Tennessee, United States. Latitude and longitude coordinates are provided for many National Register properties and districts; these locations may be seen together in a map.

There are 197 properties and districts listed on the National Register in the county, including 7 National Historic Landmarks.

See also National Register of Historic Places listings in Sumner County, Tennessee for additional properties in Goodlettsville, a city that spans the county line.

Current listings

|}

Former listings

|}

See also

 List of National Historic Landmarks in Tennessee
 National Register of Historic Places listings in Tennessee

References

Davidson